The following is the Australian Table of Precedence.
The King of Australia: His Majesty King Charles III
The Governor-General of Australia: His Excellency General the Honourable David Hurley AC, DSC, FTSE
Governors of states in order of appointment:
Governor of Victoria Her Excellency the Honourable Linda Dessau AC, CVO (1 July 2015)
Governor of New South Wales Her Excellency the Honourable Margaret Beazley AC, KC (2 May 2019)
Governor of Tasmania Her Excellency the Honourable Barbara Baker AC (16 June 2021)
Governor of South Australia Her Excellency the Honourable Frances Adamson AC (7 October 2021)
Governor of Queensland Her Excellency the Honourable Jeannette Young AC, PSM (1 November 2021)
Governor of Western Australia His Excellency the Honourable Chris Dawson AC, APM (15 July 2022)
The Prime Minister: The Honourable Anthony Albanese MP
The President of the Senate and the Speaker of the House of Representatives in order of election:
President of the Senate Senator The Honourable Sue Lines (26 July 2022)
Speaker of the House of Representatives The Honourable Milton Dick MP (26 July 2022)
The Chief Justice of Australia: The Honourable Chief Justice Susan Kiefel AC
Senior diplomatic posts:
Ambassadors and High Commissioners in order of date of presentation of the Letters of Credence or Commission
Chargés d'affaires en pied or en titre in order of date of presentation of the Letters of Credence or Commission
Chargés d'affaires and Acting High Commissioners in order of date of assumption of duties
Members of the Federal Executive Council:
Ministry List
Administrators of Territories in order of appointment:
Administrator of Norfolk Island (Eric Hutchinson) (1 April 2017)
 Administrator of the Australian Indian Ocean Territories (Acting: Sarah Vandenbroek) (4 October 2022)
 Administrator of the Northern Territory (Hugh Heggie) (2 February 2023)
The Leader of the Opposition: The Honourable Peter Dutton MP
Former holders of high offices:
Former Governors-General in order of leaving office:
The Hon Bill Hayden AC (1989–1996)
The Hon Sir William Deane AC KBE KC (1996–2001)
The Rt. Rev and Hon Dr Peter Hollingworth AC OBE (2001–2003)
The Hon Dame Quentin Bryce AD CVO (2008–2014)
General the Hon Sir Peter Cosgrove AK CVO MC (2014–2019)
Former Prime Ministers in order of leaving office:
The Hon Paul Keating (1991–1996)
The Hon John Howard OM AC SSI (1996–2007)
The Hon Kevin Rudd AC (2007–2010, 2013)
The Hon Julia Gillard AC (2010–2013)
The Hon Tony Abbott AC (2013–2015)
The Hon Malcolm Turnbull AC (2015–2018)
The Hon Scott Morrison (2018–2022)
Former Chief Justices in order of leaving office:
The Hon Sir Anthony Mason AC KBE GBM KC (1987–1995)
The Hon Murray Gleeson AC GBS KC (1998–2008)
The Hon Robert French AC (2008–2017)
Premiers of states in order of state populations, then Chief Ministers of the territories in order of territory populations:
Premier of New South Wales (The Hon Dominic Perrottet MP)
Premier of Victoria (The Hon Daniel Andrews MP)
Premier of Queensland (The Hon Annastacia Palaszczuk MP)
Premier of Western Australia (The Hon Mark McGowan MLA)
Premier of South Australia (The Hon Peter Malinauskas MHA)
Premier of Tasmania (The Hon Jeremy Rockliff MP)
Chief Minister of the Australian Capital Territory (Andrew Barr MLA)
Chief Minister of the Northern Territory (The Hon Natasha Fyles MLA)
Justices of the High Court in order of appointment:
The Hon Stephen Gageler AC (9 October 2012)
The Hon Michelle Gordon AC (9 June 2015)
The Hon James Edelman (30 January 2017)
The Hon Simon Steward (1 December 2020)
The Hon Jacqueline Sarah Gleeson (1 March 2021)
The Hon Jayne Jagot (17 October 2022)
Senior judges:
Chief Justice of the Federal Court of Australia (The Hon James Allsop AC)
President of the Fair Work Commission (Iain Ross AO)
Chief Justices of States in order of appointment:
Chief Justice of New South Wales (H.E. The Hon Tom Bathurst AC KC FRSN) (1 June 2011)
Chief Justice of South Australia (The Hon Chris Kourakis SC) (25 June 2012)
Chief Justice of Tasmania (The Hon Alan Blow AO) (8 April 2013)
Chief Justice of Victoria (Anne Ferguson) (2 October 2017)
Chief Justice of Western Australia (Peter Quinlan SC) (13 August 2018)
Chief Justice of Queensland (The Hon Helen Bowskill KC) (19 March 2022)

 Australian members of the Privy Council of the United Kingdom in order of appointment:
The Rt Hon Ian Sinclair (17 January 1977)
The Rt Hon Sir William Heseltine (26 March 1986)
The Chief of the Defence Force (General Angus Campbell)
Chief Judges of Federal and Territory Courts in order of appointment
Chief Justice of the Australian Capital Territory (Helen Murrell) (28 October 2013)
Chief Justice of the Northern Territory (Michael Grant) (5 July 2016)
Chief Justice of the Family Court of Australia (Will Alstergren) (10 December 2018)
Members of Parliament (see Members of the Australian Senate, 2019–2022 and Members of the Australian House of Representatives, 2019–2022)
Judges of the Federal Court of Australia and Family Court of Australia, and Deputy presidents of the Fair Work Commission in order of appointment
Lord Mayors of capital cities in order of city populations:
Lord Mayor of Sydney (Clover Moore)
Lord Mayor of Melbourne (Sally Capp)
Lord Mayor of Brisbane (Adrian Schrinner)
Lord Mayor of Perth (Basil Zempilas)
Lord Mayor of Adelaide (Sandy Verschoor)
Lord Mayor of Hobart (Anna Reynolds)
Lord Mayor of Darwin (Kon Vatskalis)
Heads of religious communities according to the date of assuming office in Australia
Presiding officers of State Legislatures in order of appointment, then Presiding Officer of Territory Legislatures in order of appointment:
Speaker of the Victorian Legislative Assembly (Colin Brooks) (7 March 2017)
Speaker of the Legislative Assembly of Queensland (Curtis Pitt) (13 February 2018)
President of the Victorian Legislative Council (Nazih Elasmar) (18 June 2020)
Speaker of the New South Wales Legislative Assembly (Jonathan O'Dea) (7 May 2019)
President of the Tasmanian Legislative Council (Craig Farrell) (21 May 2019)
President of the South Australian Legislative Council (John Dawkins) (8 September 2020)
Speaker of the Western Australian Legislative Assembly (Michelle Roberts) (29 April 2021)
President of the New South Wales Legislative Council (Matthew Mason-Cox) (4 May 2021)
President of the Western Australian Legislative Council (Alanna Clohesy) (25 May 2021)
Speaker of the Tasmanian House of Assembly (Mark Shelton) (22 June 2021)
Speaker of the South Australian House of Assembly (Dan Cregan) (12 October 2021)
Speaker of the Australian Capital Territory Legislative Assembly (Joy Burch) (31 October 2016)
Speaker of the Northern Territory Legislative Assembly (Ngaree Ah Kit) (20 October 2020)
Members of State Executive Councils in order of state populations, and then members of the Northern Territory Executive Council:
Executive Council of New South Wales
Executive Council of Victoria
Executive Council of Queensland
Executive Council of Western Australia
Executive Council of South Australia
Executive Council of Tasmania
Executive Council of the Northern Territory
Leaders of the Opposition of State Legislatures in order of state populations, then Leaders of the Opposition in Territory Legislatures in order of territory populations:
Leader of the Opposition of New South Wales (Chris Minns)
Leader of the Opposition of Victoria (John Pesutto)
Leader of the Opposition of Queensland (David Crisafulli)
Leader of the Opposition of Western Australia (Mia Davies)
Leader of the Opposition of South Australia (Peter Malinauskas)
Leader of the Opposition of Tasmania (Rebecca White)
Leader of the Opposition of the Australian Capital Territory (Elizabeth Lee)
Leader of the Opposition of the Northern Territory (Lia Finocchiaro)
Judges of State and Territory Supreme Courts in order of appointment:
Supreme Court of New South Wales
Supreme Court of Victoria
Supreme Court of Queensland
Supreme Court of Western Australia
Supreme Court of South Australia
Supreme Court of Tasmania
Supreme Court of the Northern Territory
Members of State and Territory Legislatures in order of population:
New South Wales Legislative Assembly and Legislative Council
Victorian Legislative Assembly and Legislative Council
Queensland Legislative Assembly
Western Australian Legislative Assembly and Legislative Council
South Australian House of Assembly and Legislative Council
Tasmanian House of Assembly and Legislative Council
Australian Capital Territory Legislative Assembly
Northern Territory Legislative Assembly
The Secretaries of Departments of the Australian Public Service and their peers and the Chiefs of the Air Force, Army, and Navy and Vice Chief of the Defence Force in order of first appointment to this group:
Vice Chief of the Defence Force (Vice Admiral David Johnston, AO, RAN) (6 July 2018)
Chief of Army (Lieutenant General Richard Burr, AO, DSC, MVO) (2 July 2018)
Chief of Air Force (Air Marshal Mel Hupfeld, AO, DSC) (3 July 2019)
Chief of Navy (Vice Admiral Mark Hammond, AM, RAN) (6 July 2022)
Consuls-General, Consuls and Vice-Consuls according to the date on which recognition was granted
Members of the Australian Capital Territory Legislative Assembly
Recipients of Decorations or Honours from the Sovereign
Citizens of the Commonwealth of Australia

Notes

 The Location of Officials matters for precedence; an official enjoys different precedence within and without his or her state.
 Each State and Territory also has its own Table of Precedence.
 The recipients of Decorations or Honours gain precedence in the order of Seniority or Superiority of the Orders themselves; the Orders of Knighthood in Australia have the same seniority as in the United Kingdom, with a few insertions or promotions of entirely Australian, non-British honours; see Australian Honours Order of Wearing.
 Until 2022, no reference was made to the Chief Minister, the Leader of the Opposition or the Speaker of the Australian Capital Territory. This appeared to be an oversight after the ACT was granted self government. A new Table of Precedence was gazetted on 1 September 2022 which included the ACT.

References

Table of Precedence for the Commonwealth of Australia– as Gazetted in Commonwealth Gazette C2022G00834 on Thursday 1 September 2022.
Table of Precedence as per DFAT Protocol Office (download)

Australia
Australia politics-related lists
Government of Australia